The National Progressive Democrats was a small socialist political party in the Republic of Ireland, active between 1958 and 1963.

The party was founded as a left-wing progressive secular party. Its founders were Noël Browne (former Minister for Health) and Jack McQuillan, former members of the social democratic wing of Clann na Poblachta. The party was noted for its vigorous role in Dáil Éireann. Between 1958 and 1961, 7 of the 9 motions discussed in Private Member’s Time had been proposed by one of them. In 1961 and 1962, they asked 1,400 parliamentary questions, 17% of the total. Taoiseach Seán Lemass paid them a compliment by referring to them as "the real opposition". Both were re-elected at the 1961 general election, but the party won little support as it fielded only one other candidate.

The party was disbanded when it merged into the Labour Party in 1963. However, both Browne and McQuillan lost their seats in the next election contesting for the Labour Party.

List of National Progressive Democrat candidates

General election results

References

Further reading
 Barberis, Peter, John McHugh and Mike Tyldesley, 2005. Encyclopedia of British and Irish Political Organisations. London: Continuum International Publishing Group. , 
 

Defunct political parties in the Republic of Ireland
Political parties established in 1958
Political parties disestablished in 1963
Socialist parties in Ireland
1958 establishments in Ireland
1963 disestablishments in Ireland